The 2017 W-League grand final was the final match of the 2016–17 W-League season and decided the champions of women's football in Australia for the season. 

The match took place at nib Stadium in Perth, Western Australia on 12 February 2017 and was played by Perth Glory and reigning league champions Melbourne City. The match was won by Melbourne City 0–2, who recorded their second consecutive league championship. The match marked the second time both clubs qualified for a Grand Final, Perth having lost in the 2014 final and Melbourne qualifying for their second consecutive final after winning the 2016 final. The player of the match award was won by Jessica Fishlock of Melbourne City. At the time, the attendance of 4,591 was a record for W-League grand finals.

Teams

Route to the final

Match details

Match statistics
The following are the match statistics for the 2017 W-League grand final:

References

Grand final
A-League Women Grand Finals
Sport in Perth, Western Australia